Evelyn De Morgan (30 August 1855 – 2 May 1919), née Pickering, was an English painter associated early in her career with the later phase of the Pre-Raphaelite Movement, and working in a range of styles including Aestheticism and Symbolism. Her paintings are figural, foregrounding the female body through the use of spiritual, mythological, and allegorical themes. They rely on a range of metaphors (such as light and darkness, transformation, and bondage) to express what several scholars have identified as spiritualist and feminist content. Her later works also deal with the themes of war from a pacifist perspective, engaging with conflicts like the Second Boer War and World War I.

Early life
She was born Mary Evelyn Pickering at 6 Grosvenor Street, to Percival Pickering QC, the Recorder of Pontefract, and Anna Maria Wilhelmina Spencer Stanhope, the sister of the artist John Roddam Spencer Stanhope and a descendant of Coke of Norfolk who was an Earl of Leicester.

De Morgan was educated at home; according to her sister and biographer, Anna Wilhelmina Stirling, their mother insisted that "from the first Evelyn [was to] profi[t] from the same instruction as her brother."
 She studied Greek, Latin, French, German, and Italian, as well as classical literature and mythology, and was also exposed at a young age to history books and scientific texts.

Personal life 

In August 1883, Evelyn met the ceramicist William De Morgan (the son of the mathematician Augustus De Morgan), and on 5 March 1887, they married. They spent their lives together in London, visiting Florence for half the year every year from 1895 until the outbreak of WWI in 1914. Evelyn De Morgan supported the suffrage movement, and she appears as a signatory on the Declaration in Favour of Women's Suffrage of 1889. She was also a pacifist, and expressed her horror at the First World War and Boer War in over fifteen war paintings including The Red Cross and S.O.S. In 1916 she held a benefit exhibition of these works at her studio in Edith Grove in support of the Red Cross and Italian Croce Rossa.

For the first half of their marriage, De Morgan used the profits from sales of her work to help financially support her husband's pottery business; she also actively contributed ideas to his ceramics designs. The De Morgans finally achieved financial security in 1906 after the publication of William's first novel, Joseph Vance.

De Morgan and her husband were both spiritualists, and De Morgan’s sister and biographer A. M. W. Stirling credits them as the anonymous authors of a 1909 publication of automatic writings — communications with spirit beings — titled The Result of an Experiment. The introduction to this book describes the couple as practicing automatic writing together every night for many years of their marriage. Since precious little primary material in Evelyn De Morgan’s own hand has survived, this text provides important information on her faith and her approach to a range of issues, from her understanding of ultimate reality to her belief about the role of art in capturing spirit. From the moment that de Morgan encountered spiritualism, her perspective seemed to change, and her works started to reflect more ideas about darkness and death.  De Morgan uses a range of motifs to represent spiritual ideas. A few examples are Renaissance angels, heavenly auras, a distinctive contrast between light and dark, and the symbolic use of colours.  De Morgan uses complex allegories to depict her social commentary and spiritual beliefs. And the iconography in these works reflect several spiritual themes such as the progress of the spirit, the materialism of life on earth, and the imprisonment of the soul in the earthly body.  

Evelyn De Morgan died on 2 May 1919 in London, two years after the death of her husband, and was buried in Brookwood Cemetery, near Woking, Surrey. Their tombstone bears an inscription from The Result of an Experiment: “Sorrow is only of the flesh / The life of the spirit is joy”.

Career

De Morgan started drawing lessons when she was 15, and from the outset was dedicated to her craft. On the morning of her seventeenth birthday, she wrote in her diary: "Art is eternal, but life is short…" -- "I will make up for it now, I have not a moment to lose." This diary, given up after a few months, reveals her devotion to her work. She records hours upon hours of "steady work," chastising herself for "wast[ing] time" through daily tasks like going to tea and changing her dress. According to Stirling, De Morgan was interested in little other than painting, and fought hard to be considered seriously as an artist. She rebelled against any efforts to turn her into an "idle" woman, and when her mother suggested she be presented to society, De Morgan rejoined: "I'll go to the Drawing Room if you like...but if I go, I'll kick the Queen!". Stirling recounts another incident in which De Morgan rejected further attempts to introduce her to society: "It was...suggested to Evelyn that she might like to go into Society and see a little of the world, but she jumped to a conclusion respecting this process which was clearly unjustifiable in her case. 'No one shall drag me out with a halter round my neck to sell me!' was her uncompromising rejoinder."

In 1872, she was enrolled at the South Kensington National Art Training School (today the Royal College of Art) and in 1873 moved to the Slade School of Art. At Slade, she was awarded the prestigious Slade Scholarship and won several awards: the Prize and Silver Medal for Painting from the Antique; First Certificate for Drawing from the Antique; and Third Equal Certificate for Composition. She eventually left Slade to work more independently.

De Morgan was known to George Frederic Watts from infancy, and while developing as an artist she would often visit him at his studio-home, Little Holland House. She also studied under Watts's student, her uncle John Roddam Spencer Stanhope, who had a great influence on her visual style. Beginning in 1875, Evelyn often visited him in Florence where he lived. This enabled her to study the great artists of the Renaissance, and the influence of Quattrocento artists like Botticelli is especially visible in her works from this point onwards. After this period, De Morgan's art began to move away from the more traditional, classical subjects and style favoured by the Slade school towards a development of her own particular, mature style. Through Stanhope, De Morgan also developed friendships with Pre-Raphaelite painters Dante Gabriel Rossetti and William Holman Hunt. She was also friendly with other key figures in the Victorian literary and artistic world, like writer Vernon Lee.

De Morgan first exhibited in 1876 at the Dudley Gallery, and then a year later at the inaugural Grosvenor Gallery exhibition in London. She exhibited regularly until 1907, including a one-woman show at Wolverhampton Municipal Art Gallery and Museum in which 25 works were shown, including 14 for sale. After 1907, she stopped exhibiting regularly; E.L. Smith theorises that this was due to the financial security that came from the success of her husband's first novel, meaning she was no longer obligated to sell her paintings.

The vast majority of De Morgan’s works, particularly from the mid-1880s onwards, depict content or themes that can be described as broadly spiritualist. These themes arguably reach their peak in her later works like Daughters of the Mist (c. 1905–10), which use a Symbolist allegorical register to suggest their profoundly mystical content by suggestion rather than explicit declaration.

Works
 

In August 1875 De Morgan sold her first work, Tobias and the Angel. Her first exhibited painting, St Catherine of Alexandria was shown at the Dudley Gallery in 1876.

In October 1991, sixteen canvases were destroyed in a fire at Bourlet's warehouse.
Tobias and the Angel (1875)
Cadmus and Harmonia (1877)
Ariadne at Naxos (1877)
Aurora Triumphans (1877–1878 or c. 1886), Russell-Cotes Museum, Bournemouth
Night and Sleep (1878)
Goddess of Blossoms & Flowers (1880)
The Cristian Martyr (1880)
The Grey Sisters (1880–1881)
Phosphorus and Hesperus (1882)
By the Waters of Babylon (1882–1883)
Sleep and Death, the Children of the Night (1883)
Salutation or The Visitation (1883),
Love's Passing (1883–1884)
Dryad (1884–1885)
Luna (1885)
The Sea Maidens (1885–1886)
Hope in a Prison of Despair (1887)
The Soul's Prison House (1888)
Love, the Misleader (1889), private collection
The Soul’s Prison House (1889)
Medea (1889), Williamson Art Gallery, Birkenhead
Angel of Death (1890), private collection
The Garden of Opportunity (1892)
Life and Thought Emerging from the Tomb (1893), Walker Art Gallery, Liverpool
Flora (1894)
Eos (1895), Columbia Museum of Art, Columbia, South Carolina
The Undiscovered Country, Columbia Museum of Art, Columbia, South Carolina
Lux in Tenebris (1895)
Boreas and Oreithyia (1896)
Earthbound (1897)
Angel of Death (1897), private collection
Helen of Troy (1898)
Cassandra (1898)
The Valley of Shadows (1899)
The Storm Spirits (1900)
The Poor Man who Saved the City (1901)
The Love Potion (1903)
The Cadence of Autumn (1905)
Queen Eleanor & Fair Rosamund (1905)
Death of a Butterfly (c. 1905–1910)
Demeter Mourning for Persephone (1906)
Port after Stormy Seas (1905)
The Hour-Glass (1905)	
The Prisoner (1907)
Our Lady of Peace (1907)
Sleeping Earth and Walking Moon (1905-1910)
Daughters of the Mist (c.1910)
The Worship of Mammon (1909)
Death of the Dragon (1914)
The Vision (1914), private collection
S.O.S ( 1914 - 1916)
The Mourners (ca. 1915)
The Red Cross (1918)
The Gilded Cage (1919)
Deianera (unknown)
The Kingdom of Heaven Suffereth Violence

Paintings

Collections
Her works are held in Walker Art Gallery, Liverpool; National Trust properties Wightwick Manor and Knightshayes Court; Russell-Cotes Art Gallery and Museum, National Portrait Gallery; Southwark Art Collection.

References

Further reading

External links

"Evelyn De Morgan" at The Bridgeman Art Library
Grave of Evelyn and William De Morgan

 
Endless Digressions on Evelyn De Morgan by Kirsty Walker, Victorian Historian

1855 births
1919 deaths
19th-century English women artists
19th-century English painters
20th-century English women artists
20th-century English painters
Burials at Brookwood Cemetery
English pacifists
English women painters
Female Pre-Raphaelite painters
Painters from London
People from Fulham
Pre-Raphaelite painters
Women of the Victorian era